Castle Hills is a city located in Bexar County, Texas, United States. As of the 2020 census, the city had a total population of 3,978. It is an enclave of San Antonio and is part of the San Antonio Metropolitan Statistical Area.

Geography

Castle Hills is located at 29°31'18" North, 98°30'60" West (29.521762, –98.516601). The town borders Uptown San Antonio to the west and is about 7 miles (10 miles driving distance) north of Downtown San Antonio.

Castle Hills is an independent municipality, completely surrounded by the city of San Antonio.  It is bisected into a northern and southern half by interstate highway loop I-410.  It is located at the southern end of Northwest Military Highway, the northern end being located at U.S. Army Camp Bullis.

Demographics

As of the 2020 United States census, there were 3,978 people, 1,558 households, and 1,106 families residing in the city.

As of the census of 2010, there were 4,116 people, 1,887 households, and 1,124 families residing in the city. There were 2,047 housing units. The racial makeup of the city was 90.5% White, 1.0% African American, 0.3% Native American, 1.7% Asian, 4.8% from other races, and 1.7% from two or more races. 38.9% of the population were Hispanic or Latino of any race, with the majority being Mexican American.

There were 1,877 households, out of which 18.0% had children under the age of 18 living with them, 49.0% were married couples living together, 7.8% had a female householder with no husband present, and 40.4% were non-families. 35.8% of all households were made up of individuals, and 26.3% had someone living alone who was 65 years of age or older. The average household size was 2.18 and the average family size was 2.83.

In the city, the population was spread out, with 17.1% under the age of 18, 4.8% from 18 to 24, 15.2% from 25 to 44, 30.0% from 45 to 64, and 32.8% who were 65 years of age or older. The median age was 54 years.

The median income for a household in the city was $69,637, and the median income for a family was $104,716. Males had a median income of $59,911 versus $36,676 for females. The per capita income for the city was $49,137. 5.9% of the population and 4.2% of families were below the poverty line. Out of the total population, none of those under the age of 18 and 11.8% of those 65 and older were living below the poverty line.

Education

The city is served by North East Independent School District. Two elementary schools, Castle Hills Elementary School and Jackson Keller Elementary School, are within the city limits and serve portions of the city. Jackson Middle School in San Antonio serves a portion of Castle Hills, while Nimitz Middle School in San Antonio serves a portion of Castle Hills, Lee High School serves all of Castle Hills. The Lee High School campus also encompasses the International School of the Americas (ISA), North East School of the Arts (NESA) and grades 6–12 of STEM Academy   Private schools include Antonian College Preparatory High School, St. George Episcopal School, and The Christian School at Castle Hills.

City government
The City of Castle Hills is served by five Alderpersons: Joe Izbrand, Frank Paul, Kurt May, Jack Joyce, and Douglas Gregory, all elected by the people of Castle Hills, as well as the Mayor of Castle Hills, JR Treviño. The Mayor cannot vote, but does play a deciding role on many issues.

Castle Hills has its own 911 Dispatch as well as Police, Fire, and Public Works departments.  The Fire Department is a First Responder organization staffed with Firefighter/EMT(Basic and Paramedics). Acadian Ambulance Service is the EMS provider for City of Castle Hills. Castle Hills Fire Departments responds with Acadian EMS to all Fire and EMS calls.  The City of Castle Hills also has a small green-space, known as the Castle Hills Commons, located on Lemonwood Drive between the Fire Department and City Hall. City Hall is located in a building formerly used as a church.  Drinking water is provided to residents of the city by the San Antonio Water System.  Most of the properties in Castle Hills are single family residences, many located on large lots.  Many were built in the early 1950s.  Ranch style and mid century modern architecture are predominant.  There are several retail establishments in Castle Hills, mostly located along Military Highway.  Also located within Castle Hills is the McGimsey Boy Scout Camp, a  park for BSA use.

Climate
The climate in this area is characterized by hot, humid summers and generally mild to cool winters.  According to the Köppen Climate Classification system, Castle Hills has a humid subtropical climate, abbreviated "Cfa" on climate maps.

Parks and recreation
The Commons at Castle Hills, a recreational area, opened in 2003. It hosts recreational activities, and is between the fire station and city hall.

References

External links

 Castle Hills official website

Cities in Bexar County, Texas
Cities in Texas
Greater San Antonio
Enclaves in the United States